Terry C. Muck is a Christian scholar and academic. He has served as editor of Christianity Today, Dean of the E. Stanley Jones School of World Mission at Asbury Theological Seminary. In addition to a PhD. from Northwestern University, Muck holds a B.A. from Bethel College, an M.Div. from Bethel Theological Seminary, and an M.B.A. from National College of Education.

Books
 With Harold A. Netland and Gerald R. McDermott, Handbook of Religion: A Christian Engagement with Traditions, Teachings, and Practices, Baker Academic, 2014,

References

1947 births
Living people
American evangelicals
Christian writers
Editors of Christian publications
Northwestern University alumni
Bethel University (Minnesota) alumni